Criticism of suburbia dates back to the boom of suburban development in the 1950s and critiques a culture of aspirational homeownership. In the English-speaking world, this discourse is particularly prominent in the United States and Australia being prevalent both in popular culture and academia.

In the United States 

While the United States government has yet to define what counts as a "suburban neighborhood," more than half of Americans have described their neighborhoods as suburban.

Racism

Suburbs in the United States have often been criticised for instituting explicitly racist policies to deter people deemed as other.

Urban Sprawl

The demand for single-family housing has led to urban sprawl in many metropolitan areas across the United States, notably in the Los Angeles Metropolitan Area and the Northeast Megalopolis.

Environmental Issues
One of the major environmental problems associated with sprawl is land loss, habitat loss, and subsequent reduction in biodiversity. A review by Czech and colleagues finds that urbanization endangers more species and is more geographically ubiquitous in the mainland United States than any other human activity. 

Sprawl leads to increased driving, which in turn leads to vehicle emissions that contribute to air pollution and its attendant negative impacts on human health. In addition, the reduced physical activity implied by increased automobile use has negative health consequences. Sprawl significantly predicts chronic medical conditions and health-related quality of life, although it doesn't predict mental health disorders. The American Journal of Public Health and the American Journal of Health Promotion, have both stated that there is a significant connection between sprawl, obesity, and hypertension.

A heavy reliance on automobiles increases traffic throughout the city as well as automobile crashes, pedestrian injuries, and air pollution.

Increased infrastructure/transportation costs 

Living in larger, more spread out spaces generally makes public services more expensive. Since car usage becomes endemic and public transport often becomes significantly more expensive, city planners are forced to build highway and parking infrastructure, which in turn decreases taxable land and revenue, and decreases the desirability of the area adjacent to such structures. Providing services such as water, sewers, and electricity is also more expensive per household in less dense areas, given that sprawl increases lengths of power lines and pipes, necessitating higher maintenance costs.

Residents of low-density areas spend a higher proportion of their income on transportation than residents of high density areas.  The unplanned nature of outward urban development is commonly linked to increased dependency on cars. In 2003, a British newspaper calculated that urban sprawl would cause an economic loss of 3905 pounds per year, per person through cars alone, based on data from the RAC estimating that the average cost of operating a car in the UK at that time was £5,000 a year, while train travel (assuming a citizen commutes every day of the year, with a ticket cost of 3 pounds) would be only £1095.

In Australia 
Sprawling cities define the urban Australian landscape. The iconic "quarter-acre" block is often cited as fundamental to the Australian Dream; it has both cultural and political currency. In 1901, the year of Australian Federation, "almost 70 per cent of Sydney's population were living in the suburbs".

There is a profound cynicism that exists in much commentary on suburbia that is promoted by "intellectuals and others seeking to delineate the suburb" which has been characterised by "conformity, control and some sense of false consciousness".

Suburbia bashing 

Despite the fact the majority of Australians still live in the suburbs, or maybe because of it, negative discourse about suburbia, often termed "suburbia bashing", perseveres in the mainstream media. Dame Edna Everage typifies this as she demonstrates both "nostalgia and disdain for the Australian suburb and suburban life".

Prominent journalist Allan Ashbolt satirised the suburb that represented Australian nationalism, rooted in the post-World War II era, as passive and uninspired, inscribed strongly in spatial terms. In 1966, he described Australian reality accordingly:

Ashbolt, among others, represent a "tradition of abuse of the suburbs and of the majority of Australians" in Australian mainstream media.

Suburbia vs the Australian bush 
Suburbia bashing is entrenched in questions of national identity. Disparaging commentary about the suburbs often appears in contrast to the national mythology of the Australian bush. The landscape that is portrayed in the tourism advertisements, by poets and painters, does not represent the experience of the majority of Australians. The suburb and the bush are counterposed, "the bush (cast as the authentic Australian landscape) with the city (regarded as blighted foreign import)". The bush landscape is a masculine construction of a more "authentic notion of Australian national identity" exemplified by the poetry of Henry Lawson. Conversely, the suburb is feminised, epitomised by Dame Edna for more than fifty years, and more recently, by comedic team Jane Turner and Gina Riley in Kath & Kim.

Australian ugliness 
Architect and cultural critic, Robin Boyd, also criticised suburbia, referring to it as the "Australian ugliness". Boyd observed a "pursuit of respectability" in suburban spaces. Boyd writes of a contrived and superficial sense of place, centered on a "fear of reality":

The ugliness that Boyd describes is qualified as "skin deep". However, in the tradition of suburbia bashing, he proposes that there is an emptiness of spirit that can be read through an uninformed appreciation for aesthetics.

More recently there has been suggestion of a "new Australian ugliness". New suburban developments have seen the proliferation of what have become known as "McMansions". McMansions epitomise the suburbia that is attacked by Boyd for both its monotony and "featurism" Journalist Miranda Devine refers to an elitist perception that those who live in such suburban assemblages display a "poverty of spirit and a barrenness of mind" that is derived from a politics of aesthetics and taste, as expressed by Boyd fifty years ago. In this "new Australian ugliness" some commentators attribute a rise in consumer culture: "There's a concern about over-consumption. But there's little thought of why – beyond advertising-driven gullibility". Academic Mark Peel has rejected notions of gullible "consuming" residents of new suburbs by explaining his own "choice" to move to Melbourne's outer suburbs.

Peel alludes to a discourse of suburbia that is elitist, and is based on matters of taste which have translated into a socio-cultural divide. When Miranda Devine refers to the elites, she refers to an inner-city population. The divide is between the urbanites and the suburbanites, and the conflict is over national identity.

See also 
 The 'Burbs
 Home ownership in Australia
 Home-ownership in the United States

References

Bibliography 

 
 

 

 

 

 
 

 

 

 

Suburbs
Urban sociology
Australian culture
American culture